Cold Northcott is a hamlet in Cornwall, England, UK. It is on the A395 road two miles southeast of Hallworthy. It is in the civil parish of St Clether.

Wind farm
Cold Northcott wind farm is a wind farm situated near the hamlet either side of the A395. It consists of 22 twin-bladed turbines (similar to Great Eppleton) with a nameplate electrical capacity of 6.6 megawatts and estimated annual output of 16 GWh. Cold Northcott wind farm is operated by a three-man crew of engineers who perform routine maintenance on the wind turbines. The turbines are manufactured by WEG. In early 2016 the 22, twin-bladed, wind turbines were out of use due to health and safety regulations. After being out of use for nearly six months, from June 2016, 20 turbines returned to use. Two turbines are still out of use due to one being struck by lightning. The other turbine, that is out of use, had a faulty gearbox. This then caused the blades to blow off during a storm, which resulted in the whole wind farm closing for nearly six months due to health and safety regulations. During the six months, the crew of engineers carried out maintenance on the operational turbines.

References

Hamlets in Cornwall